Louis Will (1857 – 1932) was Progressive Party mayor of Syracuse, New York from 1914 to 1916. He was the only third party candidate elected mayor of Syracuse in the last century. In a year with low voter turnout, Will was elected with only 9,858 votes.

Biography 
Born to German immigrants Anton and Rosina Will, he left school early after the death of his father to run the family candlemaking business, now known as Will & Baumer.

Legacy 
His home, the Louis Will House, a large Queen Anne-style brick house, was listed on the National Register of Historic Places in 2009.

References

Mayors of Syracuse, New York
New York (state) Progressives (1912)
20th-century American politicians
1857 births
1932 deaths